Pickens is a census-designated place (CDP) in Randolph County, West Virginia, United States. It is the home of the Cunningham-Roberts Museum. Pickens has a post office with ZIP code 26230. As of the 2010 census, its population was 66.

Pickens had its start in 1892 when the railroad was extended to that point. The community was named after James Pickens, Jr., the original owner of the town site.

Climate
The climate in this area has mild differences between highs and lows, and there is adequate rainfall year-round.  According to the Köppen Climate Classification system, Pickens has a marine west coast climate, abbreviated "Cfb" on climate maps.

Notable person
Admiral Frank G. Fahrion, USN, was born in Pickens.

References

Census-designated places in Randolph County, West Virginia
Census-designated places in West Virginia